Cardiotrophin-like cytokine factor 1 (CLCF1), also known as Novel Neurotrophin-1 (NNT-1) or B cell-stimulating factor-3 (BSF-3), is a protein that in humans is encoded by the CLCF1 gene.

Function 

CLCF1 is a cytokine. It induces tyrosine phosphorylation of the IL-6 receptor common subunit glycoprotein 130 (gp130), leukemia inhibitory factor receptor beta, and the transcription factor STAT3. It has been implicated in the induction of IL-1 (via induction of corticosterone and IL-6) and serum amyloid A, and in B cell hyperplasia. CLCF1 is capable of B cell activation via gp130 receptor stimulation.

Structure 

CLCF1 is a cytokine belonging to the interleukin-6 (IL6) family. It is a secreted protein, found predominantly in lymph nodes and spleen, and contains 225 amino acids with a molecular mass of 22 kDa in its mature form. IL6 family members share similarity in gene structure and have a 4-helix bundle in their protein structure. CLCF1 is closely related to other proteins called cardiotrophin-1 and ciliary neurotrophic factor.

References

Further reading

External links
  GeneReviews/NCBI/NIH/UW entry on Cold-Induced Sweating Syndrome including Crisponi Syndrome
  OMIM enries on Cold-Induced Sweating Syndrome including Crisponi Syndrome